Euastrum oblongum is a species of desmid, in the family Desmidiaceae.

References

Desmidiaceae